The Prison Officers' Association may refer to:

POA (trade union), based in the UK, formerly known as the "Prison Officers' Association
Prison Officers' Association (Ireland)
Scottish Prison Officers' Association, now part of POA

See also 
 Corrections Association of New Zealand
 Western Australian Prison Officers' Union

Prison officer organisations